Alsup is a surname. Notable people with the surname include:

Bill Alsup (1938–2016), American race car driver
Patricia Alsup (born 1961), American diplomat 
Todd Alsup (born 1978), American pianist and singer-songwriter 
William Alsup (born 1945), United States federal judge